Matteo Berretti (born 4 April 1985) is an Italian footballer who plays for Poggibonsi.

Biography
Born in Cecina, Tuscany, Berretti started his career at Cecina. In 2002, he joined Siena. He left for Aglianese on loan and in mid-2005 sold to Potenza in co-ownership deal. In June 2007 Siena sold the remains 50% registration rights to Potenza. He was the regular starter of the team, made 112 league appearances in 4 seasons. He also sold to Arezzo in another co-ownership deal in September 2008 but bought back in June 2009. He won promotion to Serie C1 as play-offs winner in 2007.

In July 2009 he joined Taranto. In June Potenza also bought back Rosario Falcone from Taranto. He only played 9 times in 2009–10 Lega Pro Prima Divisione before left for Cavese in January 2010.

In August 2010 he left for Andria. In July 2011 he was exchanged with Vito Di Bari of Andria.

References

External links
 Football.it Profile 
 
 

Italian footballers
A.C.N. Siena 1904 players
Potenza S.C. players
Taranto F.C. 1927 players
S.S. Fidelis Andria 1928 players
Association football midfielders
Sportspeople from the Province of Livorno
1985 births
Living people
A.S.D. Jolly Montemurlo players
A.S.D. Città di Giulianova 1924 players
U.S. Agropoli 1921 players
Footballers from Tuscany
People from Cecina, Tuscany